is a Japanese voice actress.

Voice roles

Anime television series
Metal Fighter Miku - Fukurou (episode 3); Moonlight Jewels (episode 9); Newscaster (episode 10); Star Wolves (episode 7)
Revolutionary Girl Utena - Female Teacher

Anime OVA
Vixens - Kaori
Galaxy Fraulein Yuna - Serika Koromo
Jewel BEM Hunter Lime - Rosoku and Mr. Candle
Elf-ban Kakyūsei - Tatsuya Yuuki
All Purpose Cultural Cat-Girl Nuku Nuku DASH! - Aide-de-Camp (episodes 8, 10)

Drama CD

Games

Dubbing Roles

Live Action Films
Flubber - Additional Japanese-Voice dubbing Roles (VHS/DVD Editions)
She's So Lovely - Additional Japanese-Voice dubbing Roles (VHS/DVD Editions)
Soldier - Emma (VHS/DVD Editions)
Last to Surrender - Additional Japanese-Voice dubbing Roles (VHS/DVD Editions)

Live Action Television
Mighty Morphin Power Rangers - Food Fight (Voice Guest of the party food)
Goosebumps - Attack of the Mutant Parts I & II - Libby (Melissa Bathory)

External links

1965 births
Living people
Japanese video game actresses
Japanese voice actresses
Voice actresses from Saitama Prefecture